The 2019 Nigerian Senate election in Oyo State held on February 23, 2019, to elect members of the Nigerian Senate to represent Oyo State. Abdulfatai Buharirepresenting Oyo North and Teslim Folarin representing Oyo Central won on the platform of All Progressives Congress while Kola Balogun representing Oyo South won on the platform of Peoples Democratic Party.

Overview

Summary

Results

Oyo North 
A total of 18 candidates registered with the Independent National Electoral Commission to contest in the election. APC candidate Abdulfatai Buhari won the election, defeating PDP candidate Mulikat Akande Adeola and 16 other party candidates. Abdulfatai Buhari of APC received 37.12% of the votes, while Mulikat Akande Adeola received 30.81%.

Oyo Central 
A total of 21 candidates registered with the Independent National Electoral Commission to contest in the election. APC candidate Teslim Folarin won the election, defeating PDP candidate Bisi Ilaka, the incumbent and ADC candidate, Monsurat Sunmonu and 18 other party candidates. Folarin received 33.43% of the votes, while Ilaka received 30.68%.

Oyo South 
A total of 21 candidates registered with the Independent National Electoral Commission to contest in the election. PDP candidate Kola Balogun won the election, defeating APC candidate Abiola Ajimobi and 19 other party candidates. Balogun received 37.55% of the votes, while Ajimobi received 32.76%.

References 

Oyo State senatorial elections
Oyo State Senate elections